Patrick van Leeuwen (born 8 August 1969) is a Dutch professional football manager and former player who is the head coach of Ukrainian Premier League club Zorya Luhansk.

Playing career
Van Leeuwen joined Dutch top flight outfit Sparta Rotterdam at age of 16. Growing up was receiving a lot of injuries and decided to obtain a coaching certification. At age of 21 Leeuwen obtained his A License at the Sports Academy in Holland. His professional playing career with Sparta, where he made 16 league appearances.

In 1994, van Leeuwen signed for Helmond Sport in the Dutch lower leagues.

At the age of 27, he retired.

Managerial career
After retirement, he was appointed youth manager of Feyenoord, one of the Netherlands' most successful clubs. After that, van Leeuwen was appointed youth manager of Shakhtar Donetsk in Ukraine via Henk van Stee, before being appointed director of Kazakhstani side Kairat.

In 2020, van Leeuwen was appointed manager of Maccabi Tel Aviv, the most successful club in Israel. In 2020–21, under his management, the team finished in second place in the Israeli Premier League and won the Israel State Cup.

On 26 October 2021 van Leeuwen was sacked due to a poor start to the regular season.

On 28 June 2022, he was appointed as a manager for Ukrainian FC Zorya Luhansk that temporarily plays out of Zaporizhzhia due to the Russo-Ukrainian War. During the 2022–23 season Van Leeuwen won the manager of the month award for October 2022.

Honours
Maccabi Tel Aviv
 Israel State Cup: 2020–21

Individual
 Ukrainian Premier League Manager of the Month: October 2022

References

External links
 Patrick van Leeuwen at playmakerstats.com
 

1969 births
Footballers from Zoetermeer
Living people
Dutch footballers
Sparta Rotterdam players
Helmond Sport players
Eredivisie players
Dutch football managers
Dutch expatriate football managers
FC Shakhtar Donetsk non-playing staff
Maccabi Tel Aviv F.C. managers
FC Zorya Luhansk managers
Israeli Premier League managers
Expatriate football managers in Kazakhstan
Expatriate football managers in Ukraine
Expatriate football managers in Israel
Dutch expatriate sportspeople in Kazakhstan
Dutch expatriate sportspeople in Ukraine
Dutch expatriate sportspeople in Israel
Association football midfielders
Feyenoord non-playing staff